Robert Lindsay Stevenson (born 13 December 1949) is an English actor. He is the recipient of a British Academy Television Award, a Tony Award and two Laurence Olivier Awards.

His first major role on TV was playing Wolfie Smith in Citizen Smith. He appeared in sitcoms, most notably as Ben Harper in My Family, playing the role for over a decade, and narrated TV adaptations of the children's television series Brambly Hedge. His film appearances include Fierce Creatures and Wimbledon. He has appeared with the Royal Shakespeare Company and in musical theatre.

Early life
Lindsay was born in Ilkeston, Derbyshire, to Joyce (née Dunmore) and Norman Stevenson, who worked at the local Stanton Ironworks. He was one of three children and his father was a World War II veteran, having been on a minesweeper.

After leaving Gladstone Boys' School, Lindsay enrolled in the drama department of Clarendon College in Nottingham, intending to become a drama teacher. However, friends at Nottingham Playhouse encouraged him to apply to the Royal Academy of Dramatic Art (RADA), and in 1968, he was accepted there with the aid of a government grant. After graduation, he worked as a dialect coach for a repertory company in Essex, and then joined a regional theatre group.

Career

Lindsay's early career included roles in British films such as That'll Be The Day (1973), Three for All (1975), and Adventures of a Taxi Driver (1976). He came to prominence as the cockney Teddy Boy Jakey Smith in the ITV comedy series Get Some In! (1975–1977) that was based on the National Service in the RAF. He was given the starring role as delusional revolutionary Wolfie Smith in the BBC sitcom Citizen Smith (1977–1980), which raised his profile further.

Towards the end of the run of Citizen Smith, Lindsay won roles in the BBC Television Shakespeare series, including Lysander in A Midsummer Night's Dream (1981), Fabian in Twelfth Night (1980) and Benedick in Much Ado About Nothing (1984). He played Edmund in the Granada Television production of King Lear (1983).

In 1984, he appeared as a car dealership manager called Mike Barnes in a salesman's training video for Austin Rover alongside Peter Egan and George A. Cooper, which trained staff on how to sell the Austin Montego, which was launched in April of that year.

He played the role of Bill Snibson in the hugely acclaimed 1984 London revival of Me and My Girl (for which he won an Olivier Award) which subsequently transferred to Broadway, earning him a Tony Award.

Lindsay's success on Broadway and in the West End led to a starring role in the film Bert Rigby, You're a Fool (1989), although it was not a commercial success. His next role was in the James Scott-directed Strike It Rich (1990) alongside Molly Ringwald and John Gielgud. He continued, however, to enjoy success on television, and played the leading role in Alan Bleasdale's dark comedy serial G.B.H. (1991), winning a BAFTA for his performance. Lindsay was also in Bleasdale's Jake's Progress (1995) the tale of a couple played by Lindsay and Julie Walters who were struggling to cope with a 'difficult' child (Barclay Wright). Both Bleasdale serials were screened by Channel 4, as was the surreal Channel 4 sitcom Nightingales (1990–93), which also featured David Threlfall and James Ellis. In 1996, Lindsay played the title role of Becket, the play by Jean Anouilh, opposite Derek Jacobi as King Henry II for which was nominated for another Olivier Award. Lindsay won his second Olivier award after he took over the role of Fagin during 1997 in Cameron Mackintosh's London revival of Oliver! at the London Palladium.

Lindsay appeared in the films Fierce Creatures (1997) and Divorcing Jack (1998) and in 1998, he was cast in the recurring role of Captain Pellew in the ITV mini-series Hornblower, based on the novels of C.S. Forester which ran until 2003. Lindsay was also the original choice for the lead role in the drama Cracker; however, he turned the part down as he did not want to become too associated with heavy, darker drama characters. He later appeared as Fagin in the 1999 ITV Oliver Twist miniseries.

Lindsay's longest-running role has been Ben Harper in the popular BBC sitcom My Family (2000–11).

In October 2005, he starred in ITV drama series Jericho about a Scotland Yard detective investigating murder and kidnapping in London's Soho in the 1950s. In January and February 2006, he was the only actor (as Sneath) to appear in two loosely linked Stephen Poliakoff dramas, Friends and Crocodiles and Gideon's Daughter, shown on BBC One.

Lindsay has also portrayed Prime Minister Tony Blair in the Channel 4 satires A Very Social Secretary and The Trial of Tony Blair. In 2003, he appeared in an episode of Absolutely Fabulous playing the character of Pete, an old musician boyfriend of Edina Monsoon (Jennifer Saunders), and narrated the BBC documentary series Seven Wonders of the Industrial World (2003).

He appeared in the 8th Ricky Gervais Video Podcast, in which Gervais announced that Lindsay would be in the second series of Extras, appearing in the last episode of the 2006 series as an arrogant, mean-spirited version of himself. Lindsay also appeared in the romantic comedy Wimbledon, as the tennis club manager who hires Peter Colt. In 2007 at the Old Vic Theatre, Lindsay played Archie Rice in John Osborne's The Entertainer, a role first performed by Olivier in 1957. In 2009, he played the protagonist, Maddox, from the Radio 4 comedy Electric Ink by Alistair Beaton.

In 2010, Lindsay starred in the title role of Derby Live's production of Onassis before its transfer to London's West End. He played the same role in Grace of Monaco. Lindsay starred as The Examiner in the British sitcom Spy, which debuted in October 2011 on Sky 1, and returned to the cast in 2012 for a second series. In November 2011, he starred as Henry in a revival of The Lion in Winter by James Goldman at the Theatre Royal, Haymarket, London, a production which also featured Joanna Lumley as Eleanor, and was directed by Trevor Nunn.

In 2012, Lindsay appeared in the Sky detective series Falcón, episode "The Silent and the Damned", as Pablo Ortega.

In 2014, Lindsay starred as Lawrence in the UK première production of Dirty Rotten Scoundrels at Savoy Theatre London, directed and choreographed by Jerry Mitchell.

On 9 May 2015, Lindsay recited the wartime speeches of Winston Churchill at VE Day 70: A Party to Remember.

Lindsay sings the recorded version of Derby County F.C.'s song "Steve Bloomer's Watchin'", played and sung by the fans at the beginning of every home game.

In 2016, Lindsay recurred on the second season of the ABC fairy tale-themed musical comedy series Galavant as Chester Wormwood, an evil wizard/wedding planner.

In 2017, Lindsay played Hermann Einstein in the National Geographic TV series Genius. He also played Jack Cardiff in Prism at the Hampstead Theatre, a role he reprised on a UK tour in autumn 2019.

In 2019, Lindsay played supporting role of King John in Disney's Maleficent: Mistress of Evil. The film starred Angelina Jolie, Elle Fanning, Michelle Pfeiffer, Chiwetel Ejiofor, and was released on 18 October 2019.

In 2020, he appeared in the series McDonald & Dodds.

Lindsay starred as Moonface Martin in a revival of Anything Goes, directed by Kathleen Marshall, at the Barbican Theatre from July to November 2021. He received his third Olivier Award nomination for Best Actor in a Musical in 2022.

Credits

Film

Television

Theatre

Awards and nominations
BAFTA TV Awards

Olivier Awards

Tony Awards

Other awards

Personal life
In 1974, Lindsay married Cheryl Hall, who later appeared opposite him in Citizen Smith.<ref>Danny Birchall [http://www.screenonline.org.uk/tv/id/577221/index.html Citizen Smith (1977-80)"], BFI screenonline</ref> They divorced in 1980, when he started a long-term relationship with actress Diana Weston, with whom he has a daughter, Sydney Laura Stevenson, and who co-starred with him in three episodes of My Family. He married English actress, dancer and television presenter Rosemarie Ford on 31 December 2006.

On 13 September 2006, Lindsay researched his family tree in the third series of Who Do You Think You Are?. He travelled to his hometown and to Turkey, where his grandfather Raymond Dunmore had taken part in the Gallipoli campaign during World War I.

Lindsay is a lifelong supporter of Derby County F.C., which he revealed in a short section for on the CBBC program Newsround'' entitled "My Team".

Lindsay is known for his left-wing political beliefs, usually describing himself as a staunch socialist, and has marched in support of miners. He is a passionate supporter of the Labour Party, but an outspoken critic of then Prime Minister Tony Blair's decisions to go to war in Afghanistan and Iraq, saying that he was "furious" and feeling disillusioned with mainstream politics: "You see those images of Iraq and Afghanistan and Lebanon, don't you? And I suspect somewhere, when he goes home at night and the kids are in bed, he must go, 'Jesus, what have I done?'"

On 1 October 2016, Lindsay was given the Freedom of the Borough of Erewash.

Lindsay has suffered from depressive episodes and symptoms of seasonal affective disorder in winter months for most of his life. He has spoken publicly about his positive experiences with light therapy and counselling, saying that "they really do work".

References

External links

Biography on BBC site
Robert Lindsay on Who Do You Think You Are?

1949 births
20th-century English male actors
21st-century English male actors
Male actors from Derbyshire
Alumni of RADA
Best Actor BAFTA Award (television) winners
British male comedy actors
Drama Desk Award winners
English male film actors
English socialists
English male stage actors
English male television actors
Labour Party (UK) people
Laurence Olivier Award winners
Living people
People from Ilkeston
Tony Award winners